The Tennis Stadium Kitzbühel is a tennis complex located at the Kitzbüheler Tennisclub (KTC) in Kitzbühel in Austria. The stadium has hosted the Austrian Open since 1945.

See also
 List of tennis stadiums by capacity

References

Tennis venues in Austria
Sports venues in Tyrol (state)